Arnulf of Metz ( 582 – 645) was a Frankish bishop of Metz and advisor to the Merovingian court of Austrasia. He later retired to the Abbey of Remiremont. In French he is also known as Arnoul or Arnoulf. In English he is known as Arnold.

Genealogy
The Vita Sancti Arnulfi, written shortly after the saint's death, states that he was of Frankish ancestry, from "sufficiently elevated and noble parentage, and very rich in worldly goods".

Sometime after 800, most likely in Metz, a brief genealogy of the Carolingians was compiled. According to this source, Arnulf's father was a certain Arnoald, also a bishop of Metz who in turn was the son of Ansbertus and Blithilt (or Blithilde), an alleged and otherwise unattested daughter of Chlothar I. This claim of royal Merovingian descent is not confirmed by the contemporary reference.

Historian Joseph Depoin observed that Arnulf was identified as a Frank in contemporary documents, whereas Arnoald was identified by Paul the Deacon as a Roman. The Vita Gundolphi reports that Arnulf's father was Bodegisel, a Frankish noble. David H. Kelley proposed instead that Arnoald was likely an ancestor of the Carolingians through a daughter Itta, wife of Pepin of Landen. Christian Settipani revisited and expanded upon the work of Depoin and Kelley, and concurred in Arnulf's descent from Bodegisel instead of Arnoald, but noted that there was a connection between the Ripuarian Frankish royal house and the Carolingians. He argued (without dismissing the possibility of Itta's being Arnoald's daughter) that there was a connection through Arnulf's wife  Doda, whom he posited as a daughter of Arnoald. Kelly considered Settipani's proposed connection between the Carolingians and Arnoald to be probable.

Life
Arnulf was born to an important Frankish family near Nancy in Lorraine around 582. The family owned vast domains between the Moselle and Meuse rivers. As an adolescent, he was called to the Merovingian court of king Theudebert II (595–612) of Austrasia where he was educated by Gondulf of Provence. Arnulf was later sent to serve as dux at the Schelde.

Arnulf gave distinguished service at the Austrasian court under Theudebert II. He distinguished himself both as a military commander and in the civil administration; at one time he had under his care six distinct provinces. Arnulf married in 596 to a noblewoman whom later sources give the name of Dode, or Doda (born c. 584), the paternal aunt of Saint Glodesind of France, an abbess of a convent in Metz. Chlodulf of Metz was their oldest son, but more important is his second son Ansegisel, who married Begga daughter of Pepin I, Pepin of Landen. Arnulf is thus the male-line grandfather of Pepin of Herstal, great-grandfather of Charles Martel and great-great-great-grandfather of Charlemagne.

Around 611, he and his friend Romaricus, likewise an officer of the court, planned to make a pilgrimage to the Abbey of Lérins. Chlothachar, who appreciated Arnulf's administrative skills, offered him the vacant see of Metz, the capital of the Austrasian kingdom. His wife took the veil as a nun in a convent at Treves, and Arnulf saw it as a sign of God and became a priest and bishop afterwards. Arnulf continued to serve as the king's steward and courtier.

The rule of Austrasia came into the hands of Brunhilda, the grandmother of Theudebert, who ruled also in Burgundy in the name of her great-grandchildren. In 613 Arnulf joined his politics with Pepin of Landen and led the opposition of Frankish nobles against Queen Brunhilda. The revolt led to her overthrow, torture and eventual execution, and the subsequent reunification of Frankish lands under Chlothachar II.

Chlothachar later made his son Dagobert I king of Austrasia, which he ruled with the help of his adviser Arnulf. Pepin of Landen, became the mayor of the palace. In 624 Pepin and Arnulf encouraged Dagobert in the murder of Chrodoald, an important leader of the Frankish Agilolfings family. In 625 Arnulf took part in a council held by the Frankish bishops at Reims.

During his career he was attracted to religious life, and around 628 he retired to a hermitage at a mountain site in his domains in the Vosges to become a monk. His friend Romaric, whose parents had been killed by Brunhilda, had preceded him to the mountains around 613. Romaric and Amatus had already established Remiremont Abbey there. After the death of Chlothachar in 629, Arnulf settled near Habendum, where he died some time between 643 and 647. He was buried at Remiremont.

Arnulf is venerated as a saint by the Catholic Church. In iconography, he is typically portrayed with a pastoral staff or a rake in his hand.

Legends
There are three legends associated with Arnulf:

The Legend of the Ring
Arnulf was tormented by the violence that surrounded him and feared that he had played a role in the wars and murders that plagued the ruling families. Obsessed by these sins, Arnulf went to a bridge over the Moselle river. There he took off his bishop's ring and threw it into the river, praying to God to give him a sign of absolution by returning the ring to him. Many penitent years later, a fisherman brought to the bishop's kitchen a fish in the stomach of which was found the bishop's ring. Arnulf repaid the sign of God by immediately retiring as bishop and becoming a hermit for the remainder of his life.

The Legend of the Fire
At the moment Arnulf resigned as bishop, a fire broke out in the cellars of the royal palace and threatened to spread throughout the city of Metz. Arnulf, full of courage and feeling unity with the townspeople, stood before the fire and said, "If God wants me to be consumed, I am in His hands." He then made the sign of the cross at which point the fire immediately receded.

The Legend of the Beer Mug
It was July 642 and very hot when the parishioners of Metz went to Remiremont to recover the remains of their former bishop. They had little to drink and the terrain was inhospitable. At the point when the exhausted procession was about to leave Champigneulles, one of the parishioners, Duc Notto, prayed "By his powerful intercession the Blessed Arnold will bring us what we lack." Immediately the small remnant of beer at the bottom of a pot multiplied in such amounts that the pilgrims' thirst was quenched and they had enough to enjoy the next evening when they arrived in Metz. For this reason he is known as the patron saint of Brewers.

See also

 The Pippinids, who traced their descent from Arnulf
 Tonantius Ferreolus (senator)

Notes

References
 Alban Butler's Lives of the Saints, edited, revised and supplemented by Thurston and Attwater. Christian Classics, Westminster, Maryland.
 Christian Settipani – La Préhistoire des Capétiens, Première Partie.
 Saint ARNOUL – ancêtre de Charlemagne et des Européens, edited by Imp. Louis Hellenbrand. Le Comité d'Historicité Européene de la Lorraine, Metz, France, 1989.

External links
 

580s births
645 deaths
Year of birth uncertain
People from Meurthe-et-Moselle
Pippinids
Carolingian dynasty
Bishops of Metz
7th-century Frankish bishops
7th-century Frankish saints